Nitisara or the Nitisara of Kamandaki, is an ancient Indian treatise on politics and statecraft. It was authored by Kamandaka, also known as Kamandaki or Kamandakiya, who was a disciple of Chanakya. It is traditionally dated to the 4th-3rd century BCE, though modern scholarship variously dates it to between the 3rd and 7th centuries CE between Gupta and Harsha period and its in fact a recension based on Sukra Nitisara of 4th century BCE. It contains 19 sections. The work has been dedicated to Chandragupta of Pataliputra. Scholars presume that the work was modelled after the Hitopadesha.

Date 
The Kāmandakīya Nītisāra is considered to be a post-Mauryan treatise for it refers to the Mauryan emperor Chandragupta by name. On the other hand, the reference in the Mahābhārata to Kāmanda ( = Kāmandaka) (Shantiparvan, 123, 11) should place the text before completion of the growth of the Great Epic. The historian K.P Jayaswal attributes the text to the Gupta Age (3rd–6th century CE) 

It is possible to fix a terminus ante quem of the 7th century CE for the text, since the 7th-century poet Bhavabhuti refers to a Kamandaka who is described as proficient in the art of diplomacy. The Nītīsāra is also cited at the end of the first chapter of the Dasakumāracarita of Daṇḍin who lived in the latter half of the 6th century CE. Therefore, the text may have been composed anytime between the 3rd century BCE and the 7th century CE.

Structure of the Book
Nitisara contains 20 sargas (chapters) and 36 prakarans. It is based on the Arthasastra of Kautilya and deals with various social elements such as theories of social order, structure of the state, obligations of the ruler, governmental organization, principles and policies of the government, interstate relationships, ethics of envoys and spies, application of different political expedients, varieties of battle arrays, attitude towards morality, and so forth.

Similarities with Arthasastra
Nitisara shares several common aspects with Arthasastra including mastering of control over the senses including practicing of ahimsa; maintaining balance among dharma, artha and kama; emphasizing the importance of knowledge and intelligence; the seven prakrits and twelve vijigisus in a circle of kings or mandala theory; six measures of foreign policy; the upayas in which there is no war mongering and use of force as the last resort; issues of disasters (vysanas) that may afflict the constituent elements (prakrits) and how to overcome them prior to the execution of a policy; duties of diplomats and intelligence gathering; and aspects of war and use of power by sticking to the priorities of mantra-shakti (counsel or diplomacy), prabhav-shakti (economic and military power), and utsah-shakti (leadership).

Nitisara differs from Arthasastra in that the former focuses on valour and the military qualities of the ruler, whereas the latter was dependent on deliverance of kingly duties.

See also
Arthashastra
Tirukkural
Artha and Purushartha – Indian philosophical concepts
Hindu philosophy

References

Further reading
 Kāmandaki, Jesse Knutson, and Kāmandaki. The Essence of Politics. Cambridge, Massachusetts: Harvard University Press, 2021. 
 Manmatha Nath Dutt (Ed.). (1896). Kamandakiya Nitisara or The Elements of Polity (in English). Calcutta, India: Elysium Press. (276 p.)
 Raja Rajendra Lala Mitra (Ed.). (2008). The Nitisara by Kamandaki (Sisir Kumar Mitra, Trans.). The Asiatic Society. (472 p.)

Hindu texts
Ancient Indian literature
Sanskrit texts
Political books
Military strategy books
Sanskrit books
Sanskrit literature